Loplop, or more formally, Loplop, Father Superior of the Birds,  is the name of a birdlike character that was an alter ego of the Dada-Surrealist artist Max Ernst. Ernst had a ongoing fascination with birds, which often appear in his work. Loplop functioned as a familiar animal. William Rubin wrote of Ernst "Among his more successful works of the thirties are a series begun in 1930 around the theme of his alter ego, Loplop, Superior of the Birds." Loplop is an iconic image of surrealist art, the painting Loplop Introduces Loplop (1930) appears on the front cover of the Gaëtan Picon's book Surrealist and Surrealism 1919-1939, and the drawing and collage Loplop Presents (1932) was used as the frontispiece of Patrick Waldberg's book Surrealism.

The series 
Loplop first appeared in Ernst's collage novels La Femme 100 Têtes and Une Semaine de Bonté in the role of a narrator and commentator, followed by a number of works into the mid 1930s, forming an informal series of collages, paintings, and mixed media works. 

Loplop's image was not a fixed character, but highly variable in appearance and seldom depicted in the same way twice. Typically (but not always), Loplop had the head of a bird, which could be highly abstracted, often a bird with a crest, comb, or wattle. The body was a square or rectangular space (a canvas, frame, easel, or wall), with the arms and legs being zoomorphic or geometric abstraction in form. Within the "body", an image, a piece of Max Ernst's art is presented (a collage, frottage, painting, etc.) which could be equal to, or function independently from the rest of the work. See external links below, The Menil Collection, Houston, Texas: 3 Loplop drawings, for some typical examples. 

The German art historian Uwe M. Schneede offered his view —
By letting his pictures be presented through an intermediary — his art figure — rather than by himself, Ernst has changed his role, or, better still, he is showing more clearly where he stands in relation to his work. The artist-and-model iconography is adopted and, at the same time, twisted. The artist appears as his own exhibitor and intermediary: he shows his products and thus demonstrates their availability. This seems to indicate a basic change in Ernst relation toward his artistic activity — a kind of coming into the clear. At forty, he seems to have freed himself from the need to pictorialize oppressive childhood experiences and also from the rules of Surrealism, to the point where he can —with sovereign ease — make his liberating creative work (and thus the creative process itself) his main theme. 

Samantha Kavky stated in the abstract of her journal article Authorship and Identity in Max Ernst's Loplop — 
I suggest that Ernst models Loplop on the father/totem, as defined by Sigmund Freud in his Totem and Taboo of 1913. An exploration of Ernst's interpretation of Freudian theory in creating Loplop illuminates the character's surprising complexity and centrality to Ernst's oeuvre. As a totem, Loplop emerges from a primary oedipal conflict on which Ernst structures his artistic identity and practice. Equating traditional notions of creative authorship with various forms of patriarchal authority, Ernst's constructed totem signifies his personal, aesthetic and political rejection of individual mastery in favour of his fraternal allegiance to the surrealist group and his embrace of surrealist automatist practices.

Ernst was familiar with Freud's writing and titled one of his later paintings Totem and Taboo (1941, private collection).

Partial list of works 
 Loplop Introducing a Bird (1929/1957), plaster, oil, and wood, 102.2 × 123.2 cm., Museum of Contemporary Art Chicago, Chicago
 Loplop Introduces Loplop (1930). oil and mixed media on wood,100 x 180 cm. Menil Collection, Houston
 Loplop Introduces a Young Girl (1930), oil and mixed media on wood, 175 x 89 cm. Musée National d'Art Moderne, Paris 
 Anthropomorphic Figure and Shell Flowers: Loplop Introduces a Flower (c. 1930), oil and collage on wood, 99 x 81 cm., private collection
 Loplop Presents (1930), graphite frottage on paper, 29.8 × 21.6 cm., Menil Collection, Houston
 Loplop Introduces the Members of the Surrealist Groupe (1931), collage, photographs, frottage, and pencil on paper, 50.2 x 33.7 cm. The Museum of Modern Art, New York
 Loplop Presents Grapes (1931), graphite on paper with gouache mounted on paperboard, 64.8 × 49.5 cm., Menil Collection, Houston
 Loplop Presents la Marseillaise (1931), graphite frottage on paper mounted on paper, 31.1 × 22.9 cm., Menil Collection, Houston
 Facility: Loplop Introduces (1931), collage and pencil on paper, 65 x50 cm., formerly Roland Penrose collection, London
 Loplop Introduces (1932), collage and frottage with drawing, gouache, printed marble paper, paint, and crayon on paper, 50 x 64.5 cm., Art Institute of Chicago, Chicago
 Loplop Presents (1932), collage, botanical lithograph, graphite on pape 63.4 × 49.6 cm., Art Institute of Chicago, Chicago

Publications 
 Spies, Werner (1998), Max Ernst, Loplop. DuMont Reiseverlag, Ostfildern.  (German language)
 Kavky, Samantha (2005). Authorship and Identity in Max Ernst's Loplop. Art History, 28 (3): 357-385 pp.

References

External links
 The Menil Collection, Houston, Texas: 3 Loplop drawings (accessed February 14, 2021)
 Attirement of the Bride at Guggenheim Museum

Alter egos
Surrealism
Literary characters
Fictional birds